Oakland is an unincorporated community in Colorado County, Texas, United States. According to the Handbook of Texas, the community had an estimated population of 80 in 2000. It is located southwest of Weimar on Farm to Market Road 532 (FM 532) near its junction with Farm to Market Road 2144 (FM 2144).

Oakland has a post office with the ZIP code 78951. Public education in the community is provided by the Weimar Independent School District.

Geography
The intersection of FM 532 with FM 2144 is a short distance to the northeast of Oakland. By using FM 2144, which connects with FM 155, the distance to Weimar is a slightly longer . The Navidad River flows south on the west side of Oakland. Its two branches, the East and West Navidad Rivers join a short distance to the northwest of the community.

References

Unincorporated communities in Colorado County, Texas
Unincorporated communities in Texas